The Pacific seaweed pipefish (Syngnathus schlegeli) is a species of pipefish, found in the north-western Pacific Ocean, near Vladivostok (Russia), southern to Gulf of Tonkin. It is a marine, oceanic demersal fish, up to  length. It is common in beds of Zostera sea grass.

References

Syngnathus
Fish of the Pacific Ocean
Fish of East Asia
Fish of Japan
Fish of Russia
Fish of China
Taxa named by Johann Jakob Kaup
Fish described in 1856